The Hired Gun is a 1957 American CinemaScope Western film directed by Ray Nazarro and starring Rory Calhoun and Anne Francis.

Plot
Ellen Beldon is about to be hanged in Texas for the cold-blooded murder of her husband. Her uncle’s ranch foreman, Judd Farrow, masquerading as a priest busts her out of jail and escorts Ellen to a safe hideout at her uncle’s ranch in New Mexico. her uncle has enough influence to block extradition of Ellen back to Texas.

Her father-in-law, Mace Beldon, determined to avenge the killing of his son, hires gunman Gil McCord for $5,000 to track down Ellen and bring her back to Texas. Gil hires on as a cowhand and then kidnaps Ellen and they head back to Texas. On the way Ellen explains to Gil what really happened, that her husband was murdered by his step-brother, Kel Beldon, who wants to be sole heir to their father's money and land. Gil tracks down proof of Ellen’s story and Kel confronts him and is killed in a shootout. Gil and Ellen ride out of town together.

Cast
 Rory Calhoun as Gil McCord
 Anne Francis as Ellen Beldon
 Chuck Connors as Judd Farrow
 Vince Edwards as Kel Beldon
 John Litel as Mace Beldon
 Robert Burton as Nathan Conroy

Reception
According to MGM records the movie earned $395,000 in the US and Canada and $450,000 elsewhere, making a profit to the studio of $169,000.

See also
 List of American films of 1957

References

External links
The Hired Gun at TCMDB

American Western (genre) films
1957 films
Metro-Goldwyn-Mayer films
CinemaScope films
1957 Western (genre) films
Films scored by Albert Glasser
1950s English-language films
Films directed by Ray Nazarro
1950s American films